Finsch's monitor (Varanus finschi) is a species of monitor lizard in the family Varanidae. The species is native to New Guinea and Australia.

Etymology
The specific name, finschi, is in honor of German naturalist Friedrich Hermann Otto Finsch (1839-1917).

Geographic range
Finsch's monitor was only known from Blanche Bay, Ralum, and Massawa in New Britain. Further research on the available museum specimens enlarged the range of the species, which currently includes the Bismarck Archipelago (New Ireland), New Guinea and Queensland, Australia. The specimen from Queensland lacks any fixed data on its locality, so the exact distribution of Finsch's monitor in Northern Australia remains unknown.

Pet trade
Reports of this species, V. finschi, imported for the pet trade from the Kei Islands are erroneous and refer to similar though distinct animals that have yet to be formally described.

Habitat
V. finschi is found in several habitats: mangrove forest, inland forest, fresh-cut clearings, coconut plantations, and rocky beaches.

Taxonomy
V. finschi belongs to the subgenus Euprepiosaurus along with the closely related Ceram mangrove monitor, Varanus (Euprepiosaurus) cerambonensis, and the peach-throated monitor, Varanus (Euprepiosaurus) jobiensis.

Description
The dorsal pattern of V. finschi adults consists of "black ocelli, which are often arranged in irregular transverse rows - with a yellowish center on a dark grayish background." The dark head of V. finschi is speckled with many yellowish spots. Its tongue color is pink.

Reproduction
V. finschi is oviparous.

Conservation status
Finsch's monitor is of Least Concern as evaluated by the IUCN.

References

Further reading
Ast, Jennifer C. (2001). "Mitochondrial DNA Evidence and Evolution in Varanoidea (Squamata)". Cladistics 17 (3): 211-226. [erratum in 18 (1): 125].
De Lisle HF (1996). The Natural History of Monitor Lizards. Malabar, Florida: Krieger Publishing. 201 pp. .
Koch A, Arida E, Schmitz A, Böhme W, Ziegler T (2009). "Refining the polytypic species concept of mangrove monitors (Squamata: Varanus indicus group): a new cryptic species from the Talaud Islands, Indonesia, reveals the underestimated diversity of Indo-Australian monitor lizards". Australian Journal of Zoology 57 (1): 29-40.
Philipp KM, Ziegler T, Böhme W (2007). "Preliminary Investigations of the Natural Diet of Six Monitor Lizard Species of the Varanus (Euprepiosaurus) indicus Group". Mertensiella 16: 336-345.
Ziegler T, Schmitz A, Koch A, Böhme W (2007). "A review of the subgenus Euprepiosaurus of Varanus (Squamata: Varanidae): morphological and molecular phylogeny, distribution and zoogeography, with an identification key for the members of the V. indicus and the V. prasinus species groups". Zootaxa 1472: 1-28.
Ziegler, Thomas; Böhme, Wolfgang; Schmitz, Andreas (2007). "A new species of the Varanus indicus group (Squamata, Varanidae) from Halmahera Island, Moluccas: morphological and molecular evidence". Mitteilungen aus dem Museum für Naturkunde in Berlin 83 (S1): 109-119.

External links
List of monitor lizards at kingsnake.com. 

Varanus
Monitor lizards of Australia
Monitor lizards of New Guinea
Reptiles described in 1994